Jules-Albert Ndemba (born 31 October 1954) is a Cameroonian judoka. He competed in the men's half-middleweight event at the 1984 Summer Olympics.

References

1954 births
Living people
Cameroonian male judoka
Olympic judoka of Cameroon
Judoka at the 1984 Summer Olympics
Place of birth missing (living people)
20th-century Cameroonian people